Oregon Catholic Press (OCP, originally the Catholic Truth Society of Oregon) is a publisher of Catholic liturgical music based in Portland, Oregon. It published the newspapers Catholic Sentinel and El Centinela; both papers have been discontinued effective October 1, 2022.

Operations 
The not-for-profit company publishes liturgical music, books, choral collections, hymnals, missals, and support materials serving the universal and multicultural church in English, Spanish, Vietnamese, Korean and Chinese.

OCP also publishes music for youth and young adults, through its Spirit and Song imprint and religious education materials and academic and inspirational books through its Pastoral Press imprint. It also publishes the Catholic Sentinel, the diocesan newspaper for the Archdiocese of Portland. On July 21, 2022, the Archdiocese of Portland and Oregon Catholic Press issued a joint news release announcing that both the Catholic Sentinel and El Centinela would close on Oct. 1.

OCP represents well-known contemporary Catholic liturgical music composers Dan Schutte, and the other members known as the St. Louis Jesuits (Bob Dufford, John Foley, Tim Manion and Roc O'Connor), Bernadette Farrell, Carey Landry, Michael Joncas, Jamie Cortez, Bob Hurd, Tom Kendzia, and Christopher Walker.  Newer songwriters, Steve Angrisano, Jesse Manibusan and Sarah Heart are represented by the Spirit and Song imprint. 

Along with GIA Publications, OCP is a co-owner of OneLicense.net, having merged LicenSingOnline.org with OneLicense.net on January 1, 2017.

Response to COVID-19
As part of the COVID-19 pandemic, the company received $3 million in a federally backed small business loan from Zions Bank as part of the first round of the Paycheck Protection Program. The company stated it would allow them to retain 157 jobs. The loan was subsequently forgiven.

Publications
Missals 
Breaking Bread, an annual missal, available with or without weekly readings.
Today's Missal, a seasonal missal printed 3 times a year. 
Heritage Missal, an annual missal, with a repertoire leaning towards traditional hymns, Latin & chant.
Misal de Dia, the Spanish-language equivalent to the English seasonal missal Today's Missal.
Choose Christ Missal, an annual missal with a repertoire that leans towards youth and emerging Praise and Worship styles of music.
Unidos en Cristo, a bilingual (Spanish & English) missal, with music and readings in both languages. 
Hymnals 
Glory and Praise, popular hymnal first published by North American Liturgy Resources in the 70's and 80's with Vatican II renewal. OCP purchased North American Liturgical Resources in 1987 and integrated Glory & Praise into its product lineup. In 2015, OCP published Glory and Praise Third Edition, expanding with newer compositions, bilingual and Spanish songs that represent the multicultural church today.
JourneySongs, a hymnal consisting of traditional Catholic music and popular contemporary songs from Music Issue and Spirit & Song. 
Spirit & Song, music for youth and teens, as well as emerging Praise and Worship style songs.
Rise Up & Sing, Scripture-based, liturgical hymnal for young children.
Never Too Young, Contemporary songs for middle schoolers for prayer, liturgy and the classroom.
Flor y Canto, a bilingual hymnal for churches that worship in both English and Spanish.
Thánh Ca Dân Chúa, Music to support the rich culture and spiritual heritage of the Vietnamese community.

OCP also publishes Respond & Acclaim, a yearly subscription-based psalm resource, which includes a responsorial psalm and a gospel acclamation for every Sunday and Holy Day. The music for the Respond & Acclaim psalms was written by former publisher Owen Alstott.

Leadership

 Bp. Alexander Sample, as Archbishop of Portland from 2013 to present, chairman of the board of directors.
 Wade Wisler, publisher, since April 2016.
 John Limb, publisher emeritus, continues to support the mission and strategic plans for OCP.
 Owen Alstott, former publisher and member of the board of directors.

See also
 Contemporary Catholic liturgical music

References

External links

NAMM (National Association of Music Merchants) Oral History Interview with John Limb April 26, 2006 

Companies based in Portland, Oregon
Contemporary Catholic liturgical music
Catholic publishing companies
Religious mass media in the United States
Roman Catholic Archdiocese of Portland in Oregon
Music publishing companies of the United States
Book publishing companies based in Oregon
Publishing companies established in 1922
1922 establishments in Oregon